The Men of Frau Clarissa is a 1922 German silent film directed by Fred Sauer and starring Oskar Marion, Hilde Wolter and Colette Corder.

The film's sets were designed by the art director Franz Schroedter.

Cast
 Oskar Marion as Legationsrat Dr. Steeven
 Hilde Wolter as Clarissa, seine Frau
 Rolf Prasch as Renesos, Attaché
 Colette Corder as Seine Freu
 Max Ruhbeck as Graf Beauchamps
 C.W. Tetting as Kommissar
 Hugo Fischer-Köppe as Bobby Watson
 Alfred Schmasow as Kriminalbeamter
 Editha Seidel as Henny Meaton

References

External links

1922 films
Films of the Weimar Republic
German silent feature films
Films directed by Fred Sauer
German black-and-white films
1920s German films